Time Runner is a maze video game, similar to Konami's 1981 Amidar arcade game, published by Funsoft in 1981. It was written for the TRS-80 by Yves Lempereur who also wrote an Atari 8-bit family version released the same year. A port to the Commodore 64 by Scott Maxwell and Troy Lyndon was published in 1983.

Gameplay
Time Runner is a game in which the player goes around the edges of 20 rectangular boxes on a checkerboard playing area to claim one as territory.

Reception
Dick McGrath reviewed the game for Computer Gaming World, and stated that "Time Runner may hold out some challenge to nimble-fingered whiz kids, but in my book it only rates about a 5 out of a possible 10 for arcade games."

See also
Kid Grid

References

External links
Review in 80 Micro
Addison Wesley Book of Atari Software 1984
Hi-Res Magazine review
Review in Ahoy!
Review in Electronic Games
Review in SoftSide

1982 video games
Atari 8-bit family games
Commodore 64 games
Maze games
Single-player video games
TRS-80 games
Video game clones
Video games developed in the United States